The MSS 1.2 is Brazilian Anti-tank guided missile with laser guidance used for close-range fighting. It is the standard personal missile launch system of the Brazilian army and marine corps. The MSS 1.2 has a range of 500 to 3,000 m and can be used against tanks, armoured vehicles, infantry, bunkers, small buildings, boats, aircraft, and helicopters. Initially, this missile was jointly developed by OTO Melara in Italy and Engesa in Brazil as the Missile Anticarro della Fanteria (MAF), with the program beginning in 1985. The MAF was later renamed the Leo, in honor of Minister of the Army Leonidas Goncalves, but that name as well gave-way to a later designation, the current MSS 1.2. After Engesa went bankrupt in 1993, the program was handed over to Orbita, and later Mectron (also a Brazilian company). OTO Melara eventually ceded the entire program to Mectron, who continued to develop it for an agonizingly long duration — after 16 more years and at least one major redesign, the MSS 1.2 was formally accepted into service with the Brazilian armed forces in 2009.

The missile is equipped with a warhead type hollow charge and a two-stage propulsion system. Guidance is performed by a laser beam projected by the fire control system. Similar in performance to the Russian 9M123 Khrizantema, it is meant to compete with other next generation missiles. The MSS-1.2 was designed to deal with current and future armored threats such as Russian T-90, American M-1 Abrams and British Challenger 2 tanks, but can also be used against low-altitude aircraft such as helicopters and unmanned aerial vehicles. It has successfully breached more than six meters of concrete in tests carried out by the Brazilian army.

Description
The anti-tank missile MSS 1.2 is in production, waiting for placement in the Brazilian Army. Although the requirement of EB was for a missile with a 2,000 meter range, during recent tests the missile remained "attitude of target", (i.e., it was guided and impacted on the target at ranges ranging from 3,500 to 4,000 meters) "We put a conservative in the serial range of 3000m. But it goes much further, and accurately, while maintaining full control."

 Flight in controlled canards cruciform configuration
 Bearing induced by the wings
 Shaped warhead with HMX explosive
 Engine two stages, with solid propellant, based on double occupancy.
 Section of control and guidance system: digital electronics, microprocessor-based
 Loop control with PID strategy
 Canards electrically actuated

Users

 Brazilian Army 48 systems (with 12 missiles each). 400 on order 2014–2017.
 Brazilian Marine Corps 12 systems (with 6 missiles each).

References

External links

Guided missiles of Brazil
Anti-tank guided missiles of Brazil
Weapons and ammunition introduced in 2009